Giuseppe Gorletti (28 August 1901 – 1986) was an Italian wrestler. He competed at the 1920 and the 1924 Summer Olympics.

References

External links
 

1901 births
1986 deaths
Olympic wrestlers of Italy
Wrestlers at the 1920 Summer Olympics
Wrestlers at the 1924 Summer Olympics
Italian male sport wrestlers
Sportspeople from Milan
20th-century Italian people